The Copa del Rey  1912 was the eleventh staging of the Copa del Rey, the Spanish football cup competition.

The competition started on 31 March 1912, and concluded on 12 April 1912, with the final, held at the Industria Stadium in Barcelona, in which FC Barcelona lifted the trophy for the second time ever after a 2–0 victory over Sociedad Gimnástica thanks to goals from Alfredo Massana, Pepe Rodríguez. Six teams were planned to take place in the tournament, but Athletic de Bilbao and Academia de Infantería withdrew just before the start of the tournament.

Semifinals

Final

References

External links
rsssf.com
 linguasport.com

1912
1912 domestic association football cups
1911–12 in Spanish football